Linda Hoxit is a former dancer and model who appeared on television and movies during the 1970s and 80s.

Career 
Hoxit is a native of Bremerton, Washington, and appeared as dancer on dozens of 1970s variety shows  including The Smothers Brothers Show, The Sonny and Cher Show, Tony Orlando and Dawn, The Brady Bunch Hour (performing water ballet as one of The Krofftettes), and The Carol Burnett Show. A member of Actors’ Equity, she has appeared in over thirty musicals, including the bride role of Sarah Kines in the national tour and Broadway run of Seven Brides for Seven Brothers at the Alvin Theater in New York City. Linda was one of Ray Anthony’s "Bookends" dancers, and her film credits include Grease, History of the World, Part I (again as a synchronized swimmer), and Movie Movie.

She is the former girlfriend of rockstar Al Kooper and was featured on the cover of his album "Act Like Nothing's Wrong" with her head super imposed with Kooper's hairy torso and legs.

Personal life
After 12 years based in Los Angeles, Linda returned home to the Seattle area where she taught dance and acting for many years. Most recently, she was an acting coach at the John Robert Powers School in Seattle.  After twenty years of marriage to Richard E. Smith, she was widowed in January 2011. Linda continued to stay in touch with many of her dance colleagues.  She was married to Alan Almeida, Operations Manager of The Sacramento Theatre Company, and now makes her home in Sacramento, CA, where she began her professional career in the early 70's at Sacramento Light Opera Association's, "Music Circus".

See also
The Krofftettes
Brady Bunch Hour

References

External links
 Interview with Linda Hoxit

Official Al Kooper website
 

American female dancers
American dancers
Female models from Washington (state)
Living people
Dancers from Washington (state)
Year of birth missing (living people)
21st-century American women